Oleo is an album by New York Unit, consisting of tenor saxophonist George Adams, pianist John Hicks, bassist Richard Davis, and drummer Tatsuya Nakamura. It was recorded in 1989.

Recording and music
The album was recorded at A&R Recording Studios in New York City, on January 29, 1989.

Release
Oleo was released by CBS/Sony in Japan.

Track listing
"Jumonji"
"Oleo"
"Dance of the Matador"
"Hick's Time"
"Ballad #4"
"C Jam Blues"

Personnel
George Adams – tenor sax
John Hicks – piano
Richard Davis – bass
Tatsuya Nakamura – drums

References

1989 albums
John Hicks (jazz pianist) albums